Eyes absent homolog 2 is a protein that in humans is encoded by the EYA2 gene.

Function 

This gene encodes a member of the eyes absent (EYA) subfamily of proteins. The encoded protein may be post-translationally modified and may play a role in eye development. A similar protein in mice can act as a transcriptional activator. Five transcript variants encoding three distinct isoforms have been identified for this gene.

Interactions 

EYA2 has been shown to interact with GNAI2 and GNAZ.

References

Further reading

External links 
 PDBe-KB provides an overview of all the structure information available in the PDB for Human Eyes absent homolog 2 (EYA2)